Puckett Gliderport  is a privately owned public-use glider airport in Bedford County, Tennessee, United States. It is located four nautical miles (5 mi, 7 km) southeast of the central business district of Eagleville, Tennessee.

Facilities and aircraft 
Puckett Gliderport covers an area of 15 acres (6 ha) at an elevation of 780 feet (238 m) above mean sea level. It has one runway designated 14/32 with a turf surface measuring 2,200 by 145 feet (671 x 44 m).

For the 12-month period ending October 31, 2010, the airport had 2,900 general aviation aircraft operations, an average of 241 per month. At that time there were 12 aircraft based at this airport: 67% glider and 33% single-engine.

References

External links 
 Puckett Gliderport at Tennessee DOT Airport Directory
 Aerial image as of 21 February 1992 from USGS The National Map

Airports in Tennessee
Buildings and structures in Bedford County, Tennessee
Gliderports in the United States
Transportation in Bedford County, Tennessee